Round Rock SC is a semi-pro soccer club in Round Rock, Texas competing in the Lone Star Division of the Southern Conference in USL League Two. They previously played in the United Premier Soccer League in 2018 and 2019.

History

Founded in 2017, the club joined the United Premier Soccer League, in the unofficial fifth tier of the United States soccer league system for the 2018 Spring UPSL season. They transferred to USL League Two, a fourth tier league, beginning in the 2021 season.

Year-by-year

References

USL League Two teams
Association football clubs established in 2017
Soccer clubs in Texas
2017 establishments in Texas
United Premier Soccer League teams